The 27 MHz CB27/81 Bandplan is a list of the channel frequencies for FM CB radio in the United Kingdom.

Unlike CB usage in the United States, and subsequently elsewhere in the world, the original UK 40 channels progress in order with 10 kHz spacing. These channels apply to UK-only radios meeting MPT-1320 (marked CB 27/81) and MPT-1382 (marked PR 27/97, these may also feature the additional 40 CEPT channels). In 2006, the UK 27/81 Bandplan was introduced by the Republic of Ireland's Comreg as one of two sets of channels available for the Wireless Public Address System (WPAS) licensing scheme (similar to the UK's CADS – Community Audio Distribution System), as many Irish churches were already illegally using UK 27/81 CB equipment for this purpose. Usage of the 27/81 channels for CB however remains illegal in the Republic of Ireland, though usage has been noted in areas near the Northern Ireland border.

By convention, channel 9 is set aside for emergency use, channel 14 is a 'calling' channel, where one CBer can call someone else before they both move to another channel for the bulk of their conversation.  Channel 19 is commonly used by mobile stations (in vehicles).

References

Bandplans
Radio hobbies
Citizens band radio